Project Shadowchaser III, also known as Shadowchaser III, Project Shadowchaser 3000 and Edge Of Darkness, is a 1995 science fiction film by director John Eyres. It is the third installment in the 
Project Shadowchaser film series.

Premise

The third chapter in this science fiction series finds a space station in dire trouble after colliding with an old mining vessel that has been deserted...except for one murderous android!

Cast
Sam Bottoms as Kody

Musetta Vander as Rea

Christopher Atkins as Snake

Frank Zagarino as Android

Christopher Neame as Renko

Ricco Ross as Lennox

Aubrey Morris as Professor

Robina Alston as Dee

Bill Kirchenbauer as Wheels

Mark Phelan as Mac

Andrew Lamond as Daniel Peterson

Kelly Hunt as Tanya Deal

Scott Williams as Yuri Pastov

Elizabeth Giordano as Tatiana

Raymond Lynch as Yakav

Red Horton as Man #1

DVD release

The film was released on DVD in 2007 by Image Entertainment as a double feature with Project Shadowchaser II.

See also
 Project Shadowchaser
 Project Shadowchaser II
 Project Shadowchaser IV

External links
 

1995 films
1990s science fiction action films
American science fiction action films
American independent films
1995 independent films
Project Shadowchaser films
1990s English-language films
1990s American films